A hickey, hickie or love bite in British English, is a bruise or bruise-like mark caused by kissing or sucking skin, usually on the neck, arm, or earlobe. While biting may be part of giving a hickey, sucking is sufficient to burst small superficial blood vessels under the skin.

Etymology 
The origin of the word is from its earlier meaning of "pimple, skin lesion" (c. 1915); perhaps a sense extension and spelling variation from the earlier word meaning "small gadget, device; any unspecified object" which has an unknown origin (1909).

Treatment 
Hickeys typically last from 5 to 12 days and may be treated in the same way as other bruises. Ways to reduce the appearance of hickeys include icing recent hickeys to reduce swelling, rubbing them with a chilled spoon to remove the bruise, and applying a warm compress to older hickeys to dilate vessels and promote blood flow. They can be covered with a concealer or powder corresponding to the sufferer's skin tone, or a fake tan.  Alternatively, articles of clothing such as scarves, snoods, turtle necks, or sleeves may be used to conceal hickeys.

Are love bites painful?

If your partner gives you a hickey, the area might be a little sore for the first day or two afterward. You might also experience a tiny bit of swelling. You shouldn't have any serious pain or swelling, though.

References

External links 

Injuries
Sexual acts
Injuries of neck